Ribera d'Ondara is a municipality in the province of Lleida and autonomous community of Catalonia, Spain. The municipality is split into three parts, the biggest central part containing the main town, Sant Antolí i Vilanova.

References

External links
 Government data pages 

Municipalities in Segarra